Blue Crane Route Local Municipality is an administrative area in the Sarah Baartman District of the Eastern Cape in South Africa.

The municipality is named after the South African national bird, the blue crane.

Main places
The 2001 census divided the municipality into the following main places:

Politics 

The municipal council consists of eleven members elected by mixed-member proportional representation. Six councillors are elected by first-past-the-post voting in six wards, while the remaining five are chosen from party lists so that the total number of party representatives is proportional to the number of votes received. In the election of 1 November 2021, the African National Congress (ANC) won a majority of six seats on the council.
The following table shows the results of the election

Footnotes

References

External links
 Official website

Local municipalities of the Sarah Baartman District Municipality